Jiahe is a town in Panji District, Huainan, Anhui.

References

Panji District
Township-level divisions of Anhui